The 2007 Royal League Final determined the winner of the 2006–07 edition of the football tournament Royal League. It was contested at Brøndby Stadion on March 15, 2007, between Danish teams Brøndby IF and F.C. Copenhagen.

Match facts

See also
Royal League 2006-07

External links
 Brøndby vinder Royal League 

Royal League Finals
Royal League Final 2007
Royal League Final 2007
Final
Royal League
March 2007 sports events in Europe